Matt Bachand (born April 29, 1977) is an American guitarist. He has strong death metal and thrash metal influences. He is rhythm guitarist and backing vocalist for the heavy metal band Shadows Fall, and the bassist for Act of Defiance.

He is known for his deep growls or death growl, which is often heard in death metal genre. In Shadows Fall, he can also be heard using a clean vocal style, such as in the song "What Drives the Weak."

In his earlier days around the early through the mid-1990s, he was a guitarist for the death metal band Exhumed (not the deathgrind band Exhumed) and briefly was part of another death metal band, Perpetual Doom. Matt and Jon formed Shadows Fall in late 1995 and released their first album Somber Eyes to the Sky in 1997, which was released through Matt Bachand's self-produced label Lifeless Records.

He also played guitar and sang in a band called Empty, who released an 11-song CD, Before the Sunrise, through Wilderness Records in 1996. The band's music is not heavy metal, and features Bachardt and Jeff Kukucka's harmonizing vocals together and playing acoustic guitars throughout. He will be the touring bassist on Times of Grace's upcoming European and North American tours. Bachand will be filling in for Daniel Struble who is unable take part in the tour due to personal matters.

Bachand recently signed on as bass player for Act of Defiance, which also features former Megadeth members Chris Broderick and Shawn Drover and vocalist Henry Derek Bonner.

In 2018, Bachand provided guest vocals for the song "Take It To The Cross" on Stryper's album God Damn Evil.

He uses a custom Ibanez Prestige RGA series guitar (MBM1 Matt Bachand Signature model) and two custom Ibanez SZ guitars. One SZ has a red finish and the other has a natural finish with a five piece neck. All of his guitars feature active EMG pickups, an 81 in the bridge position and a 60 or 85 in the neck position. He also uses Engl amplifiers.

References

External links
 Matt Bachand (Shadows Fall) guitar rig

1977 births
Living people
21st-century American singers
21st-century American guitarists
American heavy metal guitarists
Rhythm guitarists
American bass guitarists
Shadows Fall members
Times of Grace members